Rashtreeya Sikshana Samithi Trust is a trust managing RV Educational Institutions in Bangalore, in the state of Karnataka, India. It was founded in 1940 by M. C. Shivananda Sarma (an educationalist) and Meda Kasturi Ranga Setty (a businessman and philanthropist).

University
 RV University

Colleges
 RV College of Engineering
 RV Institute of Technology and Management
 RV College of Architecture
 RV Skills
 RV Institute of Management (RVIM)
 RV Institute of Legal Studies
 DAPM RV Dental College
 RV College of Nursing
 RV College of Physiotherapy
 SSMRV College
 NMKRV College for Women
 RV Teachers College
 RV Teachers Training Institute
 RV Training Academy 
Pre-University Colleges
 RV PU College
 SSMRV PU College
 NMKRV PU College

Schools
 RV Public School
 RV School
 RV Girls High School

RV Aster Hospital, is a medical establishment established in collaboration between RSST and Aster Hospitals.

References

External links

Education in Karnataka
Educational institutions established in 1940
Organisations based in Bangalore
Educational organisations based in India
1940 establishments in India